Françoise Jacquerod is a Swiss Paralympic skier. She represented Switzerland in Paralympic Alpine skiing at the 1988 Paralympic Winter Games in Innsbruck (winner of two gold medals ), and in wheelchair curling at the 2022 Paralympic Winter Games in Beijing.

Career 
She competed at the 1988 Paralympic Winter Games, winning a gold medal in the giant slalom in 1:14.65 (Marilyn Hamilton winning the silver medal, finishing the race in 1: 39.48, and bronze Emiko Ikeda,  in 1: 52.32). She won a gold medal in the Women's slalom LW10.

She was the lead for the 2019 Swiss Wheelchair Curling Championship winning team.

She competed for Switzerland in the wheelchair curling tournament at the 2022 Winter Paralympics. The team won just one game and finished 11th out of 11 teams.

Jaquerod was disqualified for 10 days from Swiss Sport Integrity on February 16, 2022. After the ban on February 25 (motivating that the substance was present in the sample because, for therapeutic use, Swiss athletes had been prescribed drugs containing hydrochlorothiazide), she was authorized to compete in Beijing 2022. She accepted a six-month disqualification, disqualification, which expired on 27 September.

References

External links 
 

Living people
Swiss female curlers
Swiss wheelchair curlers
Swiss female alpine skiers
Paralympic alpine skiers of Switzerland
Paralympic wheelchair curlers of Switzerland
Alpine skiers at the 1988 Winter Paralympics
Wheelchair curlers at the 2022 Winter Paralympics
Medalists at the 1988 Winter Paralympics
Paralympic gold medalists for Switzerland
Year of birth missing (living people)